Robert Bellin (born 30 June 1952) is a British chess International Master (1978). He is a British Chess Championship winner (1979) and European Team Chess Championship bronze medalist (1980).

Biography 
At the end of the 1970s, Robert Bellin was one of the leading chess players in England. In 1978, he won the B tournament of the Wijk aan Zee Chess Festival. In 1979, Robert Bellin won the British Chess Championship.

Robert Bellin played for England in the European Team Chess Championships:
 In 1977, at eighth board in the 6th European Team Chess Championship in Moscow (+1, =3, -2),
 In 1980, at eighth board in the 7th European Team Chess Championship in Skara (+0, =2, -1) and won team bronze medal.

Robert Bellin played for England in the Clare Benedict Cup:
 In 1974, at reserve board in the 21st Clare Benedict Chess Cup in Cala Galdana (+2, =2, -0) and won team gold medal.

In 1978, Robert Bellin was awarded the FIDE International Master (IM) title. In 2016 he received the FIDE Trainer title.

Robert Bellin wrote several books on chess, mainly devoted to Chess opening theory.

He married to Czech origin International Women's Chess Grandmaster (WGM) Jana Bellin. The marriage has two children: Robert (born in 1989) and Christopher (born in 1991).

References

External links

1952 births
Living people
Sportspeople from Great Yarmouth
Chess International Masters
British chess players
English chess players